Lingus is a studio album by the rock band Amnesia. It was released on June 14, 1998, through Supreme Recordings.

Track listing

Personnel 
Beck – harmonica on "Drop Down"
Larry Corbett – cello
Peter Grant – cover art
Brad Laner – vocals, instruments, production, engineering, mixing
Josh Laner – drums, percussion
Justin Meldal-Johnsen – bass clarinet on "The Sensual Corgi"
Juno Watt – vocals on "Train Try"

References 

1998 albums
Amnesia (band) albums